Nataša Popović (born April 14, 1982) is Montenegrin female basketball player.

External links
Profile at eurobasket.com

1982 births
Living people
Sportspeople from Nikšić
Montenegrin women's basketball players
Centers (basketball)
Montenegrin expatriate basketball people in Bulgaria
Montenegrin expatriate basketball people in Croatia
Montenegrin expatriate basketball people in France
Montenegrin expatriate basketball people in Russia
Montenegrin expatriate basketball people in Spain